Qarqanatu (also Romanized as Qarqanātū; also known as Qarah Qanātū ) is a village in Balaband Rural District, in the Central District of Fariman County, Razavi Khorasan Province, Iran. At the 2006 census, its population was 61, in 11 families.

References 

Populated places in Fariman County